The following lists events that happened during 1904 in Chile.

Incumbents
President of Chile: Germán Riesco

Events 
20 October – The Treaty of Peace and Friendship (1904) is signed.

Births
12 July – Pablo Neruda, poet and politician (d. 1973)
9 November – Peggy Angus, painter (d. 1993 in England)

Deaths 
23 July – Rodolfo Amando Philippi, botanist (b. 1808)

References 

 
Years of the 20th century in Chile
Chile